Crit or CRIT may refer to:
Criterium or crit, bicycle race
Critic or critique
Crit Luallen, Kentucky Auditor of Public Accounts and potential 2008 United States Senate candidate
Criţ, a village in Buneşti Commune, Braşov County, Romania
Colorado River Indian Tribes (CRIT)
Centro de Rehabilitación Infantil Teletón (CRIT)
Hematocrit, a measure of proportion in blood volume

Crit may also refer to:
Critical theory
Critical thinking
Critical hit, an especially successful attack in role-playing games and computer and video games
Critical legal studies, a movement in legal thought
Critical management studies, a group of politically left wing and theoretically innovative approaches to management, business and organization
Critical theory (Frankfurt School) - theory in the positivistic, scientistic, or purely observational mode

See also
 Literary criticism, sometimes abbreviated as lit.